Benjamin "Ben" Aron Colonomos (born September 10, 1981) is a New York City-based media personality formerly for NBCUniversal's LXTV and WNBC's New York Live, and for the nationally syndicated Crazy Talk television series. From 2017 to 2019, he co-hosted the nationally syndicated TV talk show Pickler & Ben with country artist Kellie Pickler. As of the start of 2020, he is a features reporter for the PIX11 Morning News on WPIX-TV in New York.

Early life and education
Benjamin Aron Colonomos was born on September 10, 1981, in New York to Janis Yudelson Salerno and Mark Colonomos of Jewish heritage. He grew up in Piermont, New York and graduated from Emerson College, in Boston, Massachusetts.

Career
Aaron started his journalism career on radio in 1999 at 18 years old working for Radio Disney. After a brief stint hosting a radio show in Tucson, Arizona, he moved to Los Angeles and landed an on-air television hosting job for Daybreak OC, an Orange County-based morning lifestyle/news show serving all of Los Angeles.  From there he went to KSWB in San Diego continuing his work as a features reporter until WNBC in New York picked him up. He has worked for NBCUniversal at WNBC as their host of New York Live. There he received three consecutive Emmy Awards for "Best Features Reporter".  He was a co-host of the nationally syndicated television program, Crazy Talk as well as being a correspondent for Extra. In September 2017, Aaron began co-hosting Pickler & Ben, a syndicated talk show, with country star Kellie Pickler. After that talk show's cancellation in summer 2019, he returned to New York, staying employed by Pickler & Ben distributor Scripps as a morning features reporter for their newly-acquired New York station, WPIX-TV at the start of 2020.

Personal life
In August 2013, Aaron became engaged to ABC News Chief Meteorologist Ginger Zee. The couple wed on June 7, 2014. Their son Adrian Benjamin Colonomos was born in December 2015. in Petoskey, Michigan. On August 14, 2017, Zee announced on Good Morning America that she was pregnant with the couple's second child. On February 9, 2018, she gave birth to a boy, named Miles Macklin. The family lives in Rockland County, New York.

See also
 New Yorkers in journalism

References

External links

1981 births
Living people
Television personalities from New York City
Emerson College alumni
Jewish American journalists
21st-century American Jews
People from Rockland County, New York